Allegan County is a county in the U.S. state of Michigan. As of the 2020 United States Census, the population was 120,502. The county seat is Allegan. The name was coined by Henry Rowe Schoolcraft to sound like a Native American word.

Allegan County comprises the Holland, MI Micropolitan Statistical Area, which is included in the Grand Rapids–Kentwood–Muskegon, MI Combined Statistical Area. It is primarily an agricultural area that is rapidly becoming urbanized as the population centers of Grand Rapids on the northeast and Kalamazoo to the southeast expand into Allegan County.

The county has long been a regional tourist draw, particularly the Tulip Time Festival in Holland and the area along Lake Michigan. The Lake Michigan shoreline has long been a popular place for vacation homes, and that development continues, especially around Saugatuck and Douglas. Another draw is Allegan State Game Area, a  forest attracting campers, snowmobilers, cross-country skiers and hunters. Allegan County contains Saugatuck Dunes State Park with trails through scenic dunes and a swimming beach on Lake Michigan. The county also contains Pier Cove Park, a public beach with Lake Michigan access. Lake Allegan is a popular destination.

History
The Michigan peninsula was long occupied by bands of the Potowatomi and Ojibwe of the Lake Superior Band of Chippewa Indians. The United States government forced the tribes to cede their extensive territories to the federal government, in exchange for annuities and small reservations. The federally recognized Match-E-Be-Nash-She-Wish Band of Pottowatomi has a reservation here.

The boundaries of Allegan County were laid out by the Territorial legislature in 1831. The county was organized in 1835. At that time there were only about four European-American families in the area. Among the first settlers of Allegan County were Giles Scott and Turner Aldrich.

Geography

Adjacent counties
By land
Ottawa County – north
Kent County – northeast
Barry County – east
Kalamazoo County – southeast
Van Buren County – south
By water
Lake County, Illinois – southwest
Kenosha County, Wisconsin – west
Racine County, Wisconsin – northwest

Transportation

Major highways

Demographics

As of the 2010 United States Census, there were 111,408 people living in the county. 92.9% were White, 1.2% Black or African American, 0.6% Asian, 0.6% Native American, 2.8% of some other race and 1.9% of two or more races. 6.7% were Hispanic or Latino (of any race). 23.0% were of Dutch, 17.5% German, 8.3% English, 7.1% Irish and 7.1% American ancestry.

As of the 2000 United States Census, there were 105,665 people, 38,165 households, and 28,394 families living in the county. There were 43,292 housing units at an average density of 52 per square mile (20/km2). The racial makeup of the county was 93.47% White, 1.31% Black or African American, 0.55% Native American, 0.55% Asian, 0.03% Pacific Islander, 2.77% from other races, and 1.32% from two or more races. 5.72% of the population were Hispanic or Latino of any race. 25.6% were of Dutch, 17.8% German, 9.6% American, 8.4% English and 7.2% Irish ancestry, 93.6% spoke only English; 5.2% spoke Spanish at home.

There were 38,165 households, out of which 37.40% had children under the age of 18 living with them, 61.40% were married couples living together, 9.10% had a female householder with no husband present, and 25.60% were non-families. 20.70% of all households were made up of individuals, and 7.80% had someone living alone who was 65 years of age or older. The average household size was 2.72 and the average family size was 3.15.

The county population contained 28.90% under the age of 18, 8.00% from 18 to 24, 30.00% from 25 to 44, 22.00% from 45 to 64, and 11.10% who were 65 years of age or older. The median age was 35 years. For every 100 females, there were 99.60 males. For every 100 females age 18 and over, there were 97.60 males.

The median income for a household in the county was $45,813, and the median income for a family was $51,908. Males had a median income of $38,681 versus $26,887 for females. The per capita income for the county was $19,918. About 5.00% of families and 7.30% of the population were below the poverty line, including 7.50% of those under age 18 and 7.90% of those age 65 or over.

Religion
The Reformed Church in America was the largest Protestant denomination with 4,500 members in 11 churches.
The United Methodist Church was second, with 3,600 congregants in 20 churches.
The Christian Reformed Church was third, with 10 churches and 2,600 members.
The Catholic Church has 10,000 members .
The Church of Jesus Christ of Latter-day Saints has one meetinghouse.

Government

The county government operates the jail, maintains rural roads, operates the major local courts, records deeds, mortgages, and vital records, administers public health regulations, and participates with the state in the provision of social services. The county board of commissioners controls the budget and has limited authority to make laws or ordinances. In Michigan, most local government functions—police and fire, building and zoning, tax assessment, street maintenance, etc.—are the responsibility of individual cities and townships.

Elected officials

Prosecuting Attorney: Myrene Koch
Sheriff: Frank L. Baker
Chief 48th Circuit Court Judge: Hon. Roberts Kengis
48th Circuit Court Judge: Hon. Margaret Bakker
57th District Court Judge: Hon. Joseph Skocelas
57th District Court Judge: Hon. William Baillargeon
Family Court Judge: Hon. Michael L. Buck
County Clerk/Register of Deeds: Bob Genetski
County Treasurer: Sally L. Brooks
Drain Commissioner: Denise Medemar
County Surveyor: Kevin D. Miedema

(Information as of September 2022)

Politics
Allegan County has been strongly Republican from its start, and is very Republican even by the standards of West Michigan. Since 1884, the Republican Party nominee has carried the county vote in 94% of the elections (32 of 34 elections). It was one of the few counties in the nation where Franklin D. Roosevelt was completely shut out in all four of his successful runs for president. FDR actually garnered fewer votes in the county in his 46-state landslide of 1936 than he did in 1932. Lyndon Johnson is the only Democrat to have carried the county since 1884, and even then only by 701 votes; it was the last time a Democrat has managed even 40 percent of the county's vote until Barack Obama received 43.63 percent of its vote in 2008. The only other time that the Republicans lost the county in the 20th century was in 1912, when the GOP was mortally divided and Theodore Roosevelt carried it on the Bull Moose ticket.

Communities

Cities

Allegan (county seat)
Douglas
Fennville
Holland (partial)
Otsego
Plainwell
Saugatuck
South Haven (partial)
Wayland

Villages
Hopkins
Martin

Unincorporated communities

Argenta
Bakersville
Beachmont
Bentheim
Belknap
Bradley
Bravo
Boyd
Burnips
Castle Park
Cedar Bluff
Cheshire
Chicora
Corning
Diamond Springs
Dorr
Dunningville
East Saugatuck
East Martin
Fillmore
Ganges
Glenn
Glenn Haven Shores
Glenn Shores
Graafschap
Grange Corners
Green Lake
Hamilton
Hawkhead
Hilliards
Hooper
Hopkinsburg
Kibbie
Lacota
Lee
Leisure
Macatawa
Macks Landing
Merson
Miami Park
Millgrove
Moline
Monteith Station
Monterey
Monterey Center
Mount Pleasant
Neeley
New Salem
New Richmond
Old Saugatuck
Old Squaw Skin Landing
Overisel
Oxbow
Pearl
Pier Cove
Plummerville
Pullman
Sandy Pines
Shelbyville
Sherman Park
Shorecrest
Shorewood
South Haven Highlands
South Monterey
Spring Grove
Sulphur Springs
Watson

Townships

Allegan Township
Casco Township
Cheshire Township
Clyde Township
Dorr Township
Fillmore Township
Ganges Township
Gun Plain Charter Township
Heath Township
Hopkins Township
Laketown Township
Lee Township
Leighton Township
Manlius Township
Martin Township
Monterey Township
Otsego Township
Overisel Township
Salem Township
Saugatuck Township
Trowbridge Township
Valley Township
Watson Township
Wayland Township

See also
List of Michigan State Historic Sites in Allegan County, Michigan
National Register of Historic Places listings in Allegan County, Michigan

References

External links
Allegan County

 
Michigan counties
Grand Rapids metropolitan area
1835 establishments in Michigan Territory
Populated places established in 1835